Carrickmore railway station was a relatively short-lived calling-point on the Londonderry and Enniskillen Railway between Derry and Strabane. Situated in the townland of Carrickmore, County Donegal, the station, which had opened on 19 April 1847, was closed to all traffic with effect from 1 February 1858.

Routes

References

Disused railway stations in County Donegal
Railway stations opened in 1847
Railway stations closed in 1858
1847 establishments in Ireland
Railway stations in the Republic of Ireland opened in 1847
Railway stations in Northern Ireland opened in the 19th century